The 1953 Notre Dame Fighting Irish football team represented the University of Notre Dame during the 1953 college football season. John Lattner won the Heisman Trophy although he did not even lead the Irish in passing, rushing, receiving or scoring. Lattner held the Notre Dame record for all-purpose yards until Vagas Ferguson broke it in 1979.

Schedule

Roster
QB Ralph Gugliemi
HB Johnny Lattner
OE, DE Don Penza

Game summaries

Oklahoma

Don Penza blocked and recovered a kick to set up one touchdown and recovered a fumble that led to another Notre Dame score.

Team players drafted into the NFL

The following players were drafted into professional football following the season.

Awards and honors
 John Lattner, Heisman Trophy

References

Notre Dame
Notre Dame Fighting Irish football seasons
College football national champions
College football undefeated seasons
Notre Dame Fighting Irish football